Rural Rhythm Records is a record label based in Nashville, Tennessee specializing in recordings by bluegrass music and gospel music artists.

History
"Uncle" Jim O'Neal founded the Rural Rhythm label in 1955 in Arcadia, California. He sold via mail order, records were often produced with a generic white front sleeve with a stamped serial number in the upper right corner.

O'Neal insisted records would sell for $3.50 apiece (as opposed to major label records that sold for $3.98 to $4.98). O'Neal also released 20 songs on each LP album, as opposed to major labels who released on average 12 songs on each LP.

O'Neal died in 1982, and Sam Passamano purchased Rural Rhythm in 1987.

The Heritage Collection brand reissues recordings from the 1950s–1960s Rural Rhythm archives. Recent Heritage artists include Hylo Brown, Red Smiley and The Blue Grass Cutups, and Mac Wiseman, Don Reno, Bill Harrell, J. E. Mainer, Curly Fox, Dale Potter, Earl Taylor, Max Martin, Buck Ryan, Lee Moore, Raymond Fairchild, and Jim Greer.

Besides the Heritage Collection brand, Rural Rhythm issues bluegrass recordings under the Sound Traditions and Bluegrass Power Picks brands.

In 2017, SONY Red Distribution became the distributors of Rural Rhythm mainstream recordings. New Day Christian Distributors continues to distribute their Christian recordings.

Artists
Here is a partial list of artists who have released recordings on the Rural Rhythm label.

A – G
 Dave Adkins & Republik Steele
 Audie Blaylock and Redline
 Blue Moon Rising
 Brand New Strings
 Hylo Brown
 Melonie Cannon
 Vassar Clements
 The Cumberland Highlanders
 Doug Dillard
 Jim Eanes
 Bill Emerson and Sweet Dixie
 Ernie & Mack and the Bluegrass Cut-Ups
 Raymond Fairchild
 Curly Fox
 Gold Heart
 Jim Greer
 Steve Gulley

H – M
 Bill Harrell
 Carrie Hassler and Hard Rain
 Tim Hensley
 Clarence Jackson
 Jim & Jesse
 Clay Jones
 Randy Kohrs
 Locust Ridge
 Lonesome River Band
 J. E. Mainer
 The Marksmen Quartet
 Mac Martin
 Dwight McCall
 Lee Moore
 Russell Moore and IIIrd Tyme Out
 Mountain Heart
 Muleskinner
 Michael Martin Murphey
 Mark Houser and Bluegrass Drive

N – R
 Nevada Slim
 Nu-Blu
 Bobby Osborne
 Dale Potter
 Marty Raybon
 Lou Reid and Carolina
 Don Reno
 Ronnie Reno
 Brandon Rickman
 Ritchie Brothers
 The Roys
 Buck Ryan

S – Z
 Shady Creek Outlaws
 Cody Shuler & Pine Mountain Railroad
 Red Smiley
 Larry Sparks
 Tim Stafford
 Scotty Stoneman
 Earl Taylor
 Dick Unteed
 Jim Van Cleve
 James Wall
 Rickey Wasson
 The Wear Family
 Clarence White
 Oscar Whittington
 Mac Wiseman
 Stuart Wyrick

See also 
 List of record labels

References

External links
 
 
 

American record labels
American independent record labels